Parkers Corner is a locality in Victoria, Australia, located at the junction of Rawson Road and Tyers - Thomson Valley Road, in the Shire of Baw Baw. 

Parkers Corner Post Office opened on 16 January 1950 and closed in 1967.

References

Towns in Victoria (Australia)
Shire of Baw Baw